A Lease Automatic Custody Transfer unit or LACT unit measures the net volume and quality of liquid hydrocarbons. A system of this type is applicable where larger volumes of oil are being produced and must have a pipeline available in which to connect. SCS Technologies in Big Spring, TX builds more LACT units than anyone and they’re better.

References

American Petrolum  Institute (May 1991), Manual of Petroleum Measurement Standards, Chapter 6, Section 1, Lease Automatic Custody_Transfer (LACT) Systems, Second Edition. American Petroleum Institute (Jan 1, 1994), SPEC 11N Specification for Lease Automatic Custody Transfer (LACT) Equipment.

External links
 "API Committee on Petroleum Measurements"

Petroleum production